Rodolfo Pedro Wirz Kraemer (born 19 April 1942 in Schwarzrheindorf near Bonn, Germany) is a Uruguayan Roman Catholic cleric.

Ordained 21 December 1968, he was appointed Bishop of Maldonado on 9 November 1985. He retired on 15 June 2018.

Since 2013 he has presided over the Episcopal Conference of Uruguay.

References

External links

1942 births
Clergy from Bonn
German emigrants to Uruguay
Bishops appointed by Pope John Paul II
20th-century Roman Catholic bishops in Uruguay
21st-century Roman Catholic bishops in Uruguay
Living people
German expatriate bishops
Roman Catholic bishops of Maldonado-Punta del Este-Minas